Oegoconia huemeri is a moth of the family Autostichidae. It is found in Croatia, Italy, Switzerland, France, Spain and on Sicily.

The length of the forewings is 12–17 mm. The forewings are dark brown with whitish or yellow-whitish markings. The hindwings are bright grey-brown.

Etymology
The species is named for Dr. Peter Huemer.

References

External links
Images representing Oegoconia huemeri at Consortium for the Barcode of Life

Moths described in 2007
Oegoconia
Moths of Europe